Westham Island is an island located near Ladner, British Columbia, Canada within the City of Delta, which in turn is part of Greater Vancouver, Canada. The George C. Reifel Migratory Bird Sanctuary for migratory birds is located at the northern end of the island.  The Alaksen National Wildlife Area is also located on the island. The island is accessible via the Westham Island Bridge.

The island was named by Harry Trim who came from Westham, Sussex.

References

External links

Islands of British Columbia
Delta, British Columbia
Islands of the Fraser River